Methylobacterium platani  is a Gram-negative, aerobic and motile bacteria from the genus of Methylobacterium which has been isolated from the tree Platanus orientalis.

References

Further reading

External links
Type strain of Methylobacterium platani at BacDive -  the Bacterial Diversity Metadatabase

Hyphomicrobiales
Bacteria described in 2007